Politehnica Iași may refer to:

 FC Politehnica Iași (1945), a dissolved football club in Iași, Romania
 FC Politehnica Iași (2010), a football club in Iași, Romania
 CS Politehnica Iași, a sports society in Iași, Romania
 CS Politehnica Iași (rugby), a rugby club in Iași, Romania
 CS Politehnica Iași (men's basketball), a men's basketball club in Iași, Romania
 CS Politehnica Național Iași, a women's basketball club in Iași, Romania
 Gheorghe Asachi Technical University of Iaşi, a technical university in Iași, Romania